The following is a list of aftershocks that occurred after the earthquake in Nepal on 25 April 2015. There was some seismic activity in the Jumla district before the main shock. However, they are not foreshocks to the main shock. , over 304 aftershocks have occurred. The large number of aftershocks after the earthquake is considered normal by seismologists.

According to seismologist Roger Musson, the standard pattern for aftershocks is that the biggest aftershock will be one day after, and one magnitude less. Thus, the 6.7 magnitude aftershock on 26 April 2015 following the 7.9 magnitude main shock  would fit this pattern. It is highly unlikely that the earthquake was a foreshock preceding an even larger earthquake. Therefore, an earthquake larger than 7.9 in the near future after 25 April 2015  is not expected.

List of aftershocks 5.0 and higher
The list below is incomplete and maybe inaccurate for some aftershocks.
Note: The list below shows bigger earthquakes only.

Notes
1.  The list uses data from National Seismological Centre of Nepal, not of US Geological survey. The magnitude is local magnitude. 
2.  The earthquake of 12 May 2015 was an aftershock of Gorkha earthquake and not a separate earthquake.
3.  All times shown below (including the ones for Tibet) are in Nepal Standard Time and in 24-hour format. Seconds are not shown in all times below. 
4.  All dates are in the DD Month Year format (Little-endian).
5.  Please note that a significant number of aftershocks are missing in this list for the date between 27 April and 12 May.

References

External links 
 USGS Earthquake Hazards Program
 National Seismological Centre, Nepal

2015 Nepal earthquakes
Nepal 2015
Lists of events in Nepal
2015 in Nepal
2015, aftershocks
Natural disasters in Bihar